The Midland Football Combination was an English football league covering parts of the West Midlands. It comprised five divisions, a Premier Division, Divisions One and Two and two Reserves Divisions. The league was one of three official feeder leagues to the Midland Football Alliance.

Prior to 2006, the Premier Division was defined as step 7 in the National League System, even though it fed into the step 5 Midland Alliance. In 2006, it was re-graded as step 6, making teams in the top two divisions eligible to take part in the FA Vase and teams in the top division eligible to enter the FA Cup. The league merged with the Midland Football Alliance in 2014 to form the new Midland Football League.

History
The league was founded in 1927 as the Worcestershire Combination.  The ten founder members were Oldbury Town, Stourbridge Reserves, Kidderminster Harriers Reserves, Bewdley, Blackheath Town, Halesowen Labour, Highley Colliers, Old Carolians, Stewart & Lloyds (Bilston) and Cookley St Peters.  By the 1929–30 season four of the founding clubs had dropped out and the league had been reduced to just six teams, with the result that it held two separate competitions within the one season to bulk out the fixture list, but it then gained eight new teams and has continued to expand.

The league changed its name to the Midland Combination in 1968 to reflect the drawing of clubs from a wider area.

In the 2007–08 season, the league's representative team, drawn from clubs in Division One, reached the final of the FA National League System Cup.

League champions

Worcestershire Combination
Initially the league consisted of a single division

Due to the number of teams having dropped dramatically, the 1929–30 season consisted of two separate "half-season" leagues.

For the 1930–31 the league reverted to its standard format.

The league closed down in 1939 due to the outbreak of the Second World War and did not begin again until 1948.

For the 1960–61 season the league added a second division, with the existing division renamed Division One.

Midland Combination

For the 1979–80 season a third division was added.

For the 1983–84 season the divisions were renamed to Premier, One and Two.

For the 1993–94 season Division Three was added.

For the 2011–12 season Division Three was disbanded.

Final members
The teams that competed in the Combination's first team divisions in the 2013–14 season were as follows:

Premier Division

Alvis Sporting Club
Atherstone Town
Blackwood
Bolehall Swifts
Brocton
Bromsgrove Sporting
Castle Vale JKS – record expunged
Coventry Copsewood
Earlswood Town
Lichfield City
Littleton
Nuneaton Griff
Pelsall Villa
Pershore Town
Pilkington XXX
Racing Club Warwick
Southam United
Stafford Town
Studley

Division One
Aston
Barnt Green Spartak
Cadbury Athletic
Chelmsley Town
Coton Green
Droitwich Spa
Fairfield Villa
Feckenham
FC Glades Sporting
Hampton
Knowle
Phoenix United
Shirley Town
Sutton United
West Midlands Police

Division Two
Alcester Town
Austrey Rangers
Badsey Rangers
Barton United
Burntwood Town
Coventry United
Enville Athletic
FC Stratford
Inkberrow
Kenilworth Town
Leamington Hibernian
Northfield Town
Paget Rangers
Perrywood
Polesworth
Rostance Edwards
Rugeley Rangers – record expunged

Cup competitions
Each division other than the Premier had its own knockout competition, Division One competing for the President's Cup, Division Two for the Challenge Vase, Division Three for the Challenge Urn, and the Reserve Division for the Challenge Trophy. There were also other cup competitions run by the Midland Football Combination for its members including the Jack Mould Trophy and the Challenge Bowl.

References

 
1927 establishments in England
Football in the West Midlands (county)
Defunct football leagues in England
Sports leagues established in 1927